An exchange-traded fund (ETF) is an investment fund traded on a stock exchange that holds assets, rather than being a trading company. Such funds typically track an index. The New Zealand Exchange is the only provider of ETFs in New Zealand and has 35 of them, under the SmartShares brand. Some track New Zealand or Australian stocks, some invest directly into US listed Vanguard ETFs, and some have outsourced active management covering fixed income and cash.

See also
 List of exchange-traded funds

References 

New Zealand